This is a list of movies with singer Irène Bordoni.

Silent movies

Talking movies 
  
In 1929, Irène Bordoni made two movies with Warner Bros., Paris and The Show of Shows, but the studio concluded that Paris wasn't grossing that much, so it decided to stop making movies with her. She continued making a few other movies with small roles, but never became a big star.

See also 
Sound-on-disc

Actress filmographies
American filmographies
French filmographies